This is a list of electoral results for the electoral district of Grenville in Victorian state elections.

Members for Grenville
Two members initially, one from 1904.

 = elected in a by-election
 = died in office

Election results

Elections in the 1920s

 Two party preferred vote was estimated.

Elections in the 1910s

References

Victoria (Australia) state electoral results by district